Cornel Roman (born 12 April 1952) is a Romanian judoka. He competed in the men's lightweight event at the 1980 Summer Olympics.

References

1952 births
Living people
Romanian male judoka
Olympic judoka of Romania
Judoka at the 1980 Summer Olympics
Sportspeople from Bucharest